Ethnicity is the common characteristics of a group of people.

Ethnicity may also refer to:
 Ethnicity (United States Census), ethnicity as defined by the US census
 Ethnicity (United Kingdom), ethnicity in the United Kingdom
 Mono-ethnicity, singular ethnic identity
 Metro-ethnicity, one of more recent concepts in ethnic studies
 Symbolic ethnicity, symbolic attachment to a particular ethnicity
 Supra-ethnicity, designation for several complex phenomena, "above" the level of basic ethnicity:
 Poly-ethnicity, pluralistic ethnic identity
 Pan-ethnicity, a particular concept in ethnic studies
 Meta-ethnicity, one of more recent concepts in ethnic studies
 Ethnicities (journal), an academic journal 
 Ethnicity (album), an album by Yanni

See also 
 Ethnicity theory
 Ethnic studies
 Ethnic origin